Australophantes is a monotypic genus of dwarf spiders containing the single species, Australophantes laetesiformis. It was first described by A. V. Tanasevitch & K. Stenchly in 2012, and has only been found in Australia and on Sulawesi.

See also
 List of Linyphiidae species

References

Linyphiidae
Monotypic Araneomorphae genera
Spiders of Australia
Spiders of Oceania